"Turn Around, Look at Me" is a song written by Jerry Capehart and Glen Campbell, though Campbell is not officially credited.

In 1961, Glen Campbell released his version as a single. This was his first song to chart in the United States, hitting #62 on the Billboard Hot 100 #15 on the Adult Contemporary chart, and in Canada, it reached #9 in the CHUM Charts. This version included session drummer Earl Palmer on drums.

The Lettermen version
In 1962, The Lettermen released their version as a single. It made it to #5 on Billboard's Bubbling Under Hot 100 Singles chart, but the b-side of the single, "How Is Julie?," became the bigger hit.

Bee Gees version
In 1964, while Bee Gees were still in Australia, they released a version of the song which did not chart. It is also their fifth single, and was credited to "Barry Gibb and the Bee Gees". It was also included on the group's 1967 mop-up compilation Turn Around, Look at Us and the 1998 anthology of their Australian recordings Brilliant from Birth.

Personnel
 Barry Gibb — lead vocals
 Robin Gibb — harmony and backing vocals
 Maurice Gibb — harmony and backing vocals
 Uncredited musicians  — guitar, bass, drums, orchestra, chorus

The Vogues' version
In 1968, The Vogues released their remake as a single.  This version was by far the most successful, reaching #7 on the Hot 100 and #3 on the Adult Contemporary chart.  In 2019 it was used in a Volkswagen commercial.

Chart history

Weekly charts

Year-end charts

References

1961 singles
1962 singles
1964 singles
1968 singles
Songs written by Jerry Capehart
Glen Campbell songs
Bee Gees songs
The Vogues songs
The Lettermen songs
The Bachelors songs
1961 songs
Leedon Records singles
Reprise Records singles
Crest Records singles
Song recordings produced by Dick Glasser